Touch and Go and similar may refer to:

Transport
 Touch-and-go landing, an aviation term referring to an aircraft maneuver
 TaG (kart) (Touch and Go), a class in kart racing
 Touch 'n Go, a highway toll collection system in Malaysia
 Touch 'n Go eWallet, a mobile app based e-wallet and payment system
 "Touch and go" payment, also known as contactless payment

Literature
 Touch and Go, a 2007 memoir by Studs Terkel
 Touch and Go (play), a play by D. H. Lawrence
 Touch and Go (book), a book containing all issues of the Touch and Go punk zine
 Touch and Go (novel), a novel by C. Northcote Parkinson

Comics
 Touch-N-Go, a young street thief living in Chicago, Illinois, character from Hybrid
 Mr. Touch and Mr. Go, characters from Teenage Mutant Ninja Turtles
 "Touch and Go", an episode of the 2003 TV series Teenage Mutant Ninja Turtles

Film 
 Touch & Go (2003 film), a Canadian comedy directed by Scott Simpson
 Touch and Go (1955 film), a British comedy by Michael Truman
 Touch and Go (1980 film), an Australian heist film starring Wendy Hughes
 Touch and Go (1986 film), a comedic drama starring Michael Keaton
 Touch and Go (1991 film) (also known as Point of No Return), a Hong Kong film starring Sammo Hung
 Touch and Go (1998 film), a UK television film featuring Ewan Stewart

Games
 Yoshi Touch & Go, a 2005 video game in the Yoshi series

Music
 Touch and Go (band), a UK jazz-pop ensemble
 Touch and Go Records, an American independent record label
 Touch and Go (musical), a Broadway musical with choreography by Helen Tamiris

Songs
 "Touch and Go" (Jerry Fuller song), popularized by Al Wilson in 1974
 "Touch and Go" (Magazine song), 1978 song by Magazine
 "Touch and Go" (The Cars song), 1980 song by The Cars
 "Touch and Go", a song by Ecstasy, Passion & Pain
 "Touch and Go", a song by Emerson, Lake & Powell from Emerson, Lake & Powell
 "Touch & Go", a song by Joe Budden from Halfway House
 "Touch and Go", a song by John Foxx from Metamatic
 "Touch and Go", a song by Swingfly from God Bless the IRS